Alexander Wallace may refer to:

 Alexander Wallace (footballer) (1874–1899), English footballer
 Alexander Wallace (priest) (1891–1982)
 Alexander Doniphan Wallace (1905–1985), mathematician
 Alexander Burns Wallace (1906–1974), Scottish plastic surgeon
 Alexander S. Wallace (1810–1893), members of House of Representatives from South Carolina
 Alexander Wallace (botanist) (1829–1899)

See also

Alexandra "Alex" Wallace
Alexander Wallis, American football player